Lucas Euser (born December 5, 1983 in Napa, California) is a retired American, and former United healthcare, cyclist. After witnessing a crash, whilst competing in the 2014 US National Road Race, he stayed alongside fellow American cyclist Taylor Phinney. Following this experience; he retired, and they remain good friends.

Major results

2006
 1st Mount Tamalpais Hill Climb
2007
 1st Mount Tamalpais Hill Climb
 7th Overall Vuelta a Chihuahua
 9th Overall Tour de Georgia
2008
 1st Univest Grand Prix
 1st Stage 4 Tour de Georgia (TTT)
 4th Road race, National Road Championships
2009
 8th Overall Tour de Langkawi
2011
 9th Overall Tour of Utah
2012
 8th Overall Tour of Utah
2013
 4th Overall Tour of Utah
 7th Overall Tour of the Gila
 8th Overall Tour de Beauce
 8th Bucks County Classic

References

1983 births
Living people
People from Napa, California
American male cyclists